Música e Ciência (Portuguese for "Music and Science") is the debut album by Brazilian experimental rock duo Os Mulheres Negras, released in 1988 by WEA (present-day Warner Music Group). Produced by Pena Schmidt and with art direction by Liminha, the album was lauded for its experimentation and eclecticism, flirting with distinct stylistic influences such as The Beatles, Henry Mancini, George Gershwin and Tom Jobim, and garnered a strong cult following; nevertheless, it was a commercial failure, leading Schmidt to remark that "Brazil isn't ready for Os Mulheres Negras".

"Sub" is a Portuguese-language version of The Beatles' "Yellow Submarine". Also covered on the album are George Gershwin's "Summertime", Henry Mancini's "Peter Gunn" and Tom Jobim's "Samba do Avião".

A music video was made for the track "Eu Vi".

The album was re-issued in CD form by Warner Music Group in 2001 with a bonus track; a remixed version of "Sub". Both the vinyl and CD versions are currently out of print.

Track listing

Notes
 A. As per the album's liner notes, the song's full title is "Método Os Mulheres Negras para o Ensino do Skate na Escola Pública do Primeiro Grau no Terceiro Mundo" ("Os Mulheres Negras Method for Teaching Skateboarding in First-Degree Public Schools of the Third World")
 B. Corruption of the French-language phrase "Pourquoi, monsieur?" ("Why, sir?")

Personnel
 André Abujamra – vocals, electric guitar, synthesizer, drum machine
 Maurício Pereira – vocals, saxophone
 Pena Schmidt, Paulo Calasans – production
 Liminha – art direction
 Cacá Lima – engineering
 Gal Oppido – photography

References

1988 debut albums
Os Mulheres Negras albums
Warner Music Group albums